Waitangi is the main port and largest settlement of the Chatham Islands. It is situated on along the southern shore of Petre Bay, on the west coast of the archipelago's main island. With a population of 177 in the 2018 census, Waitangi is by far the largest settlement on the archipelago, accounting for about 27% of the group's population of 663.

Geography
Waitangi is situated along the west coast of Chatham Island between the southern end of Waitangi Bay and the northern foothills of the island's southern plateau. The Nairn River flows north through the settlement before emptying into the bay.

The town's antipode is the French town of Alzon.

Climate
Waitangi experiences an oceanic climate with mild temperatures throughout the year. Precipitation can fall at any time throughout the year, with the highest percent of rain being centered during the winter.

Demographics

Waitangi had a population of 177 at the 2018 New Zealand census, an increase of 9 people (5.4%) since the 2013 census, and a decrease of 12 people (-6.3%) since the 2006 census. There were 72 households. There were 81 males and 96 females, giving a sex ratio of 0.84 males per female. The median age was 43.7 years (compared with 37.4 years nationally), with 24 people (13.6%) aged under 15 years, 30 (16.9%) aged 15 to 29, 99 (55.9%) aged 30 to 64, and 21 (11.9%) aged 65 or older.

Ethnicities were 78.0% European/Pākehā, 66.1% Māori, 3.4% Pacific peoples, and 1.7% Asian (totals add to more than 100% since people could identify with multiple ethnicities).

Although some people objected to giving their religion, 47.5% had no religion, 37.3% were Christian and 3.4% had other religions.

Of those at least 15 years old, 15 (9.8%) people had a bachelor or higher degree, and 39 (25.5%) people had no formal qualifications. The median income was $36,100, compared with $31,800 nationally. The employment status of those at least 15 was that 90 (58.8%) people were employed full-time, 30 (19.6%) were part-time, and 0 (0.0%) were unemployed.

Arts and culture
Kōpinga Marae (Moriori for "Grove of Kopi Trees") is a large meeting house that sits atop Te Awapatiki, the traditional meeting ground of the Moriori. The meeting house opened in January 2005 and serves as both a cultural centre and more generally as a community centre for the people of Waitangi. When viewed from above, the complex takes on the shape of an albatross.

Administration and services
Waitangi is the seat of Chatham Islands Council, which provides local administration equivalent to those of New Zealand's unitary authorities. The council hosts a visiting District Court Judge, and is the base of a local police constable. A doctor and two nurses staff a four-bedroom hospital facility.

The settlement hosts two primary schools that are served by the Ministry of Education: Te One School and Kaingaroa School. Most continue their secondary education in New Zealand.

Local services in Waitangi include Port Waitangi and Fish Processing Factory, an ANZ Bank and Post Office, liquor store, general store, burger cafe, and a hotel and pub. Local volunteers run radio station Radio Weka and rebroadcast New Zealand television. Broadband and 4G mobile phone coverage are available through Spark, 2degrees and Vodafone; through a RCG network, as well as satellite and ADSL broadband services.

See also
Te One, Chatham Islands

References

External links

chathams.co.nz
Chatham Islands (last updated 1998)
Photographs of Waitangi 1907, c1920 

Populated places in the Chatham Islands
Chatham Island